Christ Church is a small Gothic Revival Anglican church located in Glandore, County Cork, Ireland. It was completed in 1861. It is dedicated to Jesus Christ. It is part of the Ross Union of Parishes in the Diocese of Cork, Cloyne, and Ross.

History 
Christ Church is located in the parish of Kilfaughnabeg. It was built between 1860 and 1861, and was sited to give views of Glandore Harbour.

Architecture 
The church was designed in the Early English style by Welland & Gillespie, and features a distinctive "ornate" bell tower. It features stained glass windows by Hardman & Co., depicting Christ in Majesty flanked by angels with thuribles.

References

Notes

Sources 

 

Architecture in Ireland
Churches in the Diocese of Cork, Cloyne and Ross
19th-century Church of Ireland church buildings
Gothic Revival church buildings in the Republic of Ireland
19th-century churches in the Republic of Ireland